Salem High School is a public high school located in Salem, Indiana. It is a class 3A school with an approximate enrollment of around 638 as of 2007.  Salem High School is a part of the Salem Community School corporation, which is a Standard Bearer District. The school colors are black and gold. Salem High School's newspaper is called The Cub and the yearbook is called The Lyon.

Athletics
Salem High School's athletic teams are the Lions and they compete in the Mid-Southern Conference of Indiana. The school offers a wide range of athletics including:

Baseball
Basketball (Men's and Women's)
Cheerleading
Cross Country (Men's and Women's)
Football
Golf (Men's and Women's)
Soccer (Men's and Women's)
Softball
Swimming (Men's and Women's)
Tennis (Men's and Women's)
Track (Men's and Women's)
Volleyball
Wrestling

See also
 List of high schools in Indiana
 Mid-Southern Conference of Indiana
 Salem, Indiana

References

External links
 Salem High School Official website

Public high schools in Indiana
Schools in Washington County, Indiana